St. Jacques may refer to:

 St. Jacques, Newfoundland and Labrador, a town in Canada
 Bruno St. Jacques (born 1980), Canadian professional ice hockey player
 Raymond St. Jacques (1930–1990), American actor

See also
 Saint-Jacques (disambiguation)
 St. James (disambiguation)
 St-Jacques, surname